Thomas Musgrave  was Dean of Carlisle from 1684  until his death in 1686.

Musgrave was educated at The Queen's College, Oxford. He was presented by the king on 23 July 1684 and installed on 30 September that year. He had previously been Rector of Great Salkeld. He died on  28 March, 1686.

References

Deans of Carlisle
Alumni of The Queen's College, Oxford
17th-century English Anglican priests
1686 deaths

Year of birth unknown